Nepal participated in the 2011 Asian Winter Games in Almaty and Astana, Kazakhstan from January 30, 2011 to February 6, 2011.

Alpine skiing

Nepal will send 1 alpine skier.

Men

References

Nations at the 2011 Asian Winter Games
Asian Winter Games
Nepal at the Asian Winter Games